National Development Fund (Saudi Arabia) (Arabic:صندوق التنمية الوطني)  The National Development Fund was established by Royal Order No. (A /13) dated 03/10/2017. It was mandated to advance the performance of development funds and banks in the Kingdom as well as to empower development funds and banks to better fulfil development priorities and economic obligations related to the Kingdom’s Vision 2030.

Specializations 
 Undertake the overall organizational, regulatory and executive supervision of development funds and banks.
 Take the necessary measures to achieve integration and coordination among development funds and banks and enable the achievement of their objectives.
 Take the necessary measures to raise the adequacy of financing and development lending of the development funds and banks, and to enhance their sustainability.
 Revise the competencies, strategies, organizations and structures of development funds and banks, their implementation plans, and the financing and lending mechanisms, and update these in a manner that meets the requirements of development priorities.
 Participate in representing the Kingdom of Saudi Arabia in regional and international organizations, agencies, events and conferences relevant to the Fund’s mandate.

Supervised Development Funds and Banks  
Real Estate Development Fund (REDF).
Saudi Fund for Development (SFD). 
The Saudi Industrial Development Fund (SIDF) . 
Agricultural Development Fund of Saudi Arabia (ADF).
 Social Development Bank (SDB).
 Saudi Human Resources Development Fund (HRDF).
 Tourism Development Fund (TDF).
 Fund of events related to the sectors of culture, entertainment, sports and tourism.
 Cultural Development Fund (CDF).
 Small and medium enterprises bank

NDF and Vision 2030  
Saudi Vision 2030 aims to create a robust foundation for a vibrant society, a thriving economy, and an ambitious nation. Grasping how vital economy diversification is to sustainability, Vision 2030 focuses on increasing the share of Non-Oil GDP and expanding private sector participation in the economy. By cultivating integration between development funds and improving their efficiency, effectiveness, and financial sustainability, NDF aims to significantly impact and overcome cyclical economic fluctuations in support of realizing Vision 2030 objectives.

Board of Directors  
 His Royal Highness Mohammad bin Salman bin Abdulaziz Crown Prince Deputy Prime Minister - Chairman of the Board of National Development Fund
 HE Mohammed Al-Tuwaijri - Vice Chairman of the Board of National Development Fund
 HE Majid bin Abdullah Al Qasabi
 HE Ahmed Al Khateeb
 HE Abdulrahman Al-Fadhli
 HE  Khalid A. Al-Falih
 HE Majid Al-Hogail
 HE Mohammed Al-Jadaan
 HE Eng. Ahmed Al-Rajhi
 HE Hamad bin Mohammed Al Al-Sheikh
 HE Bandar Alkhorayef
 HE Yasir Al-Rumayyan
 HE Dr. Fahad Toonsi
 HE Dr. Gassan Al-Shibl
 Mr. Stephen Groff - Governor of National Development Fund
 HE Faisal Al-Ibrahim - Secretary of the board of National Development Fund

References 

Economy of Saudi Arabia